That Certain Woman is a 1937 American drama film written and directed by Edmund Goulding and starring Bette Davis, Henry Fonda, and Anita Louise. It is a remake of Goulding's 1929 film The Trespasser, Gloria Swanson's first sound film.

Plot
The soap opera-like plot of the Warner Bros. release focuses on Mary Donnell, a naive young woman married to Al Haines, a bootlegger who is killed during the St. Valentine's Day massacre. In order to support herself she has taken a job as a secretary to married attorney Lloyd Rogers, who finds himself attracted to her but keeps his feelings secret out of respect for his wife. Jack Merrick, Jr., the playboy son of a wealthy client, elopes with Mary, but his disapproving father interferes and has the marriage annulled.

Soon after Mary discovers she is pregnant and decides to have the child without informing Jack. 
Jack later marries Florence ”Flip” Carson, a woman of his own social class, who later is left crippled by an automobile accident.  Mary returns to working for Lloyd Rogers.

Lloyd dies several years later at Mary's apartment.  He leaves Mary the bulk of his estate.  There's an immediate uproar in the press, bringing out Mary's past.  Jack shows up and offers to adopt Mary's son, and discovers he's the boy's father.  Lloyd's wife, believing Mary's son is her husband's illegitimate child, attempts to overturn the will.

When Jack's father learns the boy is his, the elder Merrick institutes proceedings to have Mary declared unfit and the child removed from her custody.  Jack is furious and he argues all night with him.  Florence visits Mary the next morning and, to her surprise, Mary finds Florence kind and sympathetic.  Mary insists that Jack stay with Florence and allows Jack and Florence to have the child.  Mary leaves for Europe. When Florence later dies, Jack tracks Mary down and says he's coming over to her.

Principal cast
from closing credits of film
 Bette Davis as Mary Donnell 
 Henry Fonda as Jack Merrick, Jr.
 Anita Louise as Florence Carson Merrick, ”Flip”
 Ian Hunter as Lloyd Rogers 
 Donald Crisp as Jack Merrick, Sr.
 Hugh O'Connell as Virgil Whitaker
 Katherine Alexander as Mrs. Rogers
 Mary Phillips as Amy
 Minor Watson as Tildon
 Sidney Toler as Detective Neely
 Charles Trowbridge as Dr. James
 Norman Willis as Fred
 Herbert Rawlinson as Dr. Hartman
 Tim Henning as Kenyon
 Dwayne Day as Jackie
 Jeff York as Reporter (uncredited)

Principal production credits
Art Direction ..... Max Parker    
Costume Design ..... Orry-Kelly

Critical reception
In his review in The New York Times, Frank S. Nugent declared, "For all the heaviness of its theme, for the hopeless monotony of its heroine's ill-fortune, the picture has dramatic value . . . Miss Davis performs valiantly as usual, giving color to a role which, in lesser hands, might have been colorless."

Time magazine described it as "what is known as a players' picture; everyone gets the call, and everyone responds with all the theatrical craft he can summon up."

Variety said, "The production has class and atmosphere . . . a finely made picture which deserves and will get extended first runs and which shoves Bette Davis a round or two higher as box office lure . . . [It] demands more of her talent than any film in which she has appeared . . . She displays screen acting of the highest order."

Of the film, Bette Davis herself said"[it] was certainly not one of my favorite scripts. There was a falseness to the whole project. But I did meet and work with Edmund Goulding for the first time. He concentrated on attractive shots of me - in other words, gave me the star treatment. It was the first time I had this. I was always a member of the cast - a leading member - but not made special in the way Goulding made me special in this film."

Davis and Goulding went on to collaborate on three more films: Dark Victory (1939), The Old Maid (1939), and The Great Lie (1941).

References

External links
 
 
 
 

1937 films
American black-and-white films
Sound film remakes of silent films
Remakes of American films
1930s English-language films
Films scored by Max Steiner
Films directed by Edmund Goulding
1937 romantic drama films
American romantic drama films
Warner Bros. films
1930s American films